Jean-Carles Grelier (born 15 March 1966) is a French politician of The Republicans (LR) who has represented Sarthe's 5th constituency in the National Assembly since the 2017 election.

Political career 
In parliament, Grelier has been serving on the Committee on Social Affairs. In addition to his committee assignments, he is part of the French-Bolivian Parliamentary Friendship Group, the French-Spanish Parliamentary Friendship Group and the French-Uruguayan Parliamentary Friendship Group. In September 2017, he tabled a bill in the National Assembly to ban electoral parachuting.

Grelier left The Republicans in 2017, and joined Soyons Libres.

References 

1966 births
Living people
21st-century French politicians
Deputies of the 15th National Assembly of the French Fifth Republic
Union for French Democracy politicians
The Republicans (France) politicians
People from Le Mans
Politicians from Pays de la Loire
Sciences Po alumni
Deputies of the 16th National Assembly of the French Fifth Republic